The Chess World Cup 2005 served as a qualification tournament for the FIDE World Chess Championship 2007. It was held as a 128-player tournament from 27 November to 17 December 2005 in Khanty-Mansiysk, Russia.

The top ten finishers qualified for the candidates matches of the World Chess Championship 2007. One of them (Étienne Bacrot) had already qualified for the candidates matches via rating, freeing the place for the eleventh player at the World Cup (Vladimir Malakhov).

The World Cup was won by Armenian grandmaster Levon Aronian.

Background
The 2005 World Cup was part of the cycle for the World Chess Championship 2007. The top ten finishers qualified for the 2007 Candidates tournament. However third-placed Étienne Bacrot had already qualified for the Candidates by rating, so eleventh-placed Vladimir Malakhov also qualified.

Three of the players at the World Cup, Levon Aronian, Alexander Grischuk and Boris Gelfand, were successful in the Candidates and qualified for the World Championship tournament, which was held as an eight-player double round-robin event, with Gelfand finishing third.

The four top finishers of the FIDE World Chess Championship 2005 (Veselin Topalov, Viswanathan Anand, Peter Svidler and Alexander Morozevich) were already invited to the World Championship 2007 and thus exempt from the World Cup.

Playing conditions
The tournament was in the style of the FIDE World Chess Championships between 1998 and 2004: each round consisted of a two-game match, followed by tie breaks at faster time controls if required. In rounds 1–3 losing players were eliminated. However, in rounds 4–6 defeated players progressed to the next round, to determine standings of the 16 best players.

The time control for regular games was 90 minutes for the first 40 moves and 15 minutes for the rest of the game, with 30 seconds added after each move. Tie breaks consisted of two rapid chess games (25 minutes each + 10 seconds per move); followed by two blitz games if required (5 minutes + 10 seconds per move); followed by a single Armageddon chess game if required (white has 6 minutes and must win, black has 5 minutes and only needs to draw).

Qualification
The following players qualified for the World Cup:
Three of the four semi-finalists of the FIDE World Chess Championship 2004 (Rustam Kasimdzhanov, Michael Adams and Teimour Radjabov); the fourth semi-finalist, Veselin Topalov, was the reigning FIDE World Champion and already had a berth in the next championship.
Women's World Champion 2004 (Antoaneta Stefanova).
Junior World Champion 2004 (Pendyala Harikrishna).
22 players with the highest Elo rating. The average ratings from July 2004 and January 2005 were used.
90 players qualified from the continental and zonal championships:
46 players from Europe,
19 players from the Americas,
19 players from Asia and Oceania,
6 players from Africa.
8 nominees of the FIDE President.
3 nominees of the local Organising Committee.

Participants
All players are Grandmasters unless indicated otherwise.

 , 2748
 , 2725
 , 2724
 , 2720
 , 2717
 , 2710
 , 2707
 , 2704
 , 2704
 , 2699
 , 2696
 , 2694
 , 2690
 , 2682
 , 2679
 , 2677
 , 2675
 , 2674
 , 2674
 , 2673
 , 2673
 , 2670
 , 2668
 , 2666
 , 2663
 , 2663
 , 2663
 , 2662
 , 2659
 , 2658
 , 2658
 , 2658
 , 2655
 , 2654
 , 2653
 , 2653
 , 2652
 , 2652
 , 2652
 , 2648
 , 2648
 , 2646
 , 2646
 , 2646
 , 2645
 , 2644
 , 2641
 , 2641
 , 2640
 , 2637
 , 2637
 , 2637
 , 2635
 , 2634
 , 2634
 , 2632
 , 2632
 , 2631
 , 2626
 , 2624
 , 2622
 , 2620
 , 2619
 , 2618
 , 2616
 , 2614
 , 2612
 , 2612
 , 2608
 , 2603
 , 2601
 , 2601
 , 2600
 , 2599
 , 2598
 , 2596
 , 2592
 , 2591
 , 2589
 , 2588
 , 2587
 , 2586
 , 2586
 , 2585
 , 2584
 , 2584
 , 2582
 , 2582
 , 2581
 , 2581
 , 2579
 , 2578
 , 2577
 , 2576
 , 2574
 , 2572
 , 2570
 , 2570
 , 2567
 , 2565
 , 2562
 , 2551
 , 2546
 , 2541
 , 2538
 , 2529
 , 2519, no title
 , 2516
 , 2510
 , 2510
 , 2508, IM
 , 2506
 , 2506, IM
 , 2506, IM
 , 2501
 , 2500
 , 2500, IM
 , 2491
 , 2490
 , 2480
 , 2479, IM
 , 2445, IM
 , 2432, FM
 , 2400, IM
 , 2381, no title
 , 2306, FM
 , 2303, no title
 , 2264, FM

Note: 7th seed Akopian did not show up for his first round match against Lane and lost on forfeit.

Final standings

 
 
 
 
 
 
 
 
 
 
 
 
 
 
 
 

The top 11 qualified for the 2007 Candidates Tournament.

Results, rounds 5–7

The losers in rounds 4-6 played further mini matches to establish the places 3–16.

Placement matches

Round 5
For places 9–16
(97) Magnus Carlsen 1½–½ Joël Lautier (15)
(13) Gata Kamsky 1½–½ Konstantin Sakaev (23)
(22) Vladimir Malakhov 1½–½ Alexey Dreev (12)
(19) Francisco Vallejo Pons 2½–1½ Loek van Wely (40)

Round 6
For places 5–8
(39) Sergei Rublevsky 1½–2½ Evgeny Bareev (17)
(38) Mikhail Gurevich 0–2 Boris Gelfand (5)

For places 9–12
(22) Vladimir Malakhov 2½–3½ Magnus Carlsen (97)
(13) Gata Kamsky 3½–2½ Francisco Vallejo Pons (19)

For places 13–16
(15) Joël Lautier 2½–3½ Loek van Wely (40)
(12) Alexey Dreev 1½–½ Konstantin Sakaev (23)

Round 7
3rd place match
(2) Étienne Bacrot 2½–1½ Alexander Grischuk (4)

5th place match
(5) Boris Gelfand 1½–2½ Evgeny Bareev (17)

7th place match
(39) Sergei Rublevsky 1½–½ Mikhail Gurevich (38)

9th place match
(97) Magnus Carlsen 1–3 Gata Kamsky (13)

11th place match
(22) Vladimir Malakhov 1½–½ Francisco Vallejo Pons (19)

13th place match
(40) Loek van Wely 1½–2½ Alexey Dreev (12)

15th place match
(15) Joël Lautier 3½–3½ Konstantin Sakaev (23)

Results, rounds 1-4

Section 1

Section 2

Section 3

Section 4

Section 5

Section 6

Section 7

Section 8

External links
Official site
World Cup 2005 regulations

2005
World Cup
World Cup 2005
Sport in Khanty-Mansiysk
2005 in Russian sport
International sports competitions hosted by Russia